Ken Fletcher and John Newcombe were the defending champions, but decided not to compete together. Newcome partnered with Tony Roche but lost in the quarterfinals to Peter Curtis and Graham Stilwell.

Bob Hewitt and Frew McMillan defeated Fletcher and his partner Roy Emerson in the final, 6–2, 6–3, 6–4 to win the gentlemen's doubles tennis title at the 1967 Wimbledon Championship.

Seeds

  John Newcombe /  Tony Roche (quarterfinals)
  Bob Hewitt /  Frew McMillan (champions)
  Bill Bowrey /  Owen Davidson (semifinals)
  Roy Emerson /  Ken Fletcher (final)

Draw

Finals

Top half

Section 1

Section 2

Bottom half

Section 3

Section 4

References

External links

Men's Doubles
Wimbledon Championship by year – Men's doubles